Queen of Oz is an upcoming British television sitcom developed by and starring Catherine Tate as the scandalous Princess Georgiana, a disgraced member of a fictional British Royal Family sent to rule Australia. The first series, consisting of six episodes produced by Michele Bennett and directed by Christiaan Van Vuuren, is expected to premiere on BBC One and BBC iPlayer in 2023.

Plot 
The sitcom follows Princess Georgiana (Catherine Tate), the black sheep of a fictional British Royal Family who has spent her spoilt life partying and being plastered all over the tabloids. In the wake of her latest scandal, the King takes the unprecedented step of abdicating his Australian throne in favour of his daughter, hoping that some real responsibilities will make her come to her senses.

Cast

Production 
Queen of Oz was one of a number of commissions announced at the BBC's annual Edinburgh TV Festival panel on 25 August 2022. It was reported that the six-part sitcom, written by Catherine Tate and Jeff Gutheim and directed by Christiaan Van Vuuren, will be produced by the Australian production company Lingo Pictures and filmed at the end of 2022. Producer Michele Bennett described Queen of Oz as a "fabulously witty series" and a "riotous take on royalty in Australia".

In October 2022, the talent agency MCTV specified that the filming will take place in Sydney. At the end of November, several members of the production team made social media posts with the phrase "That's a wrap", indicating the end of filming.

References

External links 

 
 

2023 British television series debuts
2020s British sitcoms
BBC television sitcoms
English-language television shows
Television shows filmed in Australia